Vietnam Technological and Commercial Joint Stock Bank, commonly referred to as Techcombank, is a publicly listed Vietnamese bank. Its shares are traded on the Ho Chi Minh City Stock Exchange under ticker TCB.

History and ownership 
Techcombank (TCB) was founded in 1993  by Vietnamese businessmen who returned from Russia. Its domestic investors include Vietnam Airlines and Masan Group.  In 2005, global bank HSBC acquired a 10% stake in Techcombank. In 2008, HSBC increased its stake in the bank to 20% by making a follow-on investment of $77.1 million. In 2017, HSBC divested its strategic investment in Techcombank by selling its 172 million share stake. In 2018, US private equity firm Warburg Pincus invested $370 million.

In 2018, the company listed its shares on the Ho Chi Minh City Stock Exchange. The company raised more than $900 million through the IPO, making it Vietnam’s largest IPO to date. The majority of the IPO shares was reserved for so-called cornerstone investors, i.e. institutional investors which included GIC, Fidelity and Dragon Capital. 

Today, Techcombank is one of the largest joint stock banks in Vietnam.  As of 2019, it has more than 300 branches and serves more than 5 million customers. As of 2021, the bank's total assets and net income were VND 568,811bn ($24.89bn) and 18,038bn ($789 million) respectively.

References

External links 

 Official website
 Beta

Banks of Vietnam
Banks established in 1993
Vietnamese companies established in 1993